Fireworks and Darkness is a 2002 young adult novel by Natalie Jane Prior. It follows the story of Simeon Runciman who is a firework maker and former dark magician who is caught up in murder and magic when his enemy reappears. It is followed by a companion book entitled Star Locket which was published in 2006.

Background
Fireworks and Darkness was first published in Australia on 1 May 2002 by Angus & Robertson in trade paperback format. In 2006 it was re-released in mass market paperback format. Fireworks and Darkness won the 2003 Davitt Award for best young-adult novel and was a short-list nominee for the 2002 Aurealis Award for best young-adult novel but lost to The Hand of Glory by Sophie Masson.

Synopsis

It follows the story of Simeon Runciman, who is a firework maker and former dark magician who is caught up in murder and magic when his enemy reappears.

References

2002 Australian novels
Australian young adult novels
Young adult fantasy novels
Australian fantasy novels
2002 fantasy novels
Angus & Robertson books